Amherstview Public School or AVPS is a Canadian public, comprehensive school located in Amherstview, Ontario, Canada.   The school was founded in 1958, and currently serves about 600+ students from Loyalist Township and Stone Mills, Ontario.   The town is in the eastern Ontario county of Lennox and Addington approximately 10 kilometers west of the city of Kingston, Ontario. The school offers classes for students in grades JK through grade 8 and is a member school of the Limestone District School Board. The school offers French immersion for students JK-grade 6.

Extracurricular activities
Student groups and activities include announcement leaders, Briargate, DPA leaders, environment club, fitness and dance club, guitar club, jewellery making club, library club, office helpers, Santa Claus Parade club, sports stacking club, and student council.

The Amerhestview sports teams, known as the Gators, participate in interscholastic competition in basketball, cross country (very successful running club), soccer, track and field (also running club), and volleyball. Sports offered at the intramural level include active games, borden ball, parachute club, Quoits, soccer, three pitch and ultimate.

References 

Elementary schools in Ontario
Middle schools in Ontario
Education in Lennox and Addington County